The men's decathlon event at the 2007 Asian Athletics Championships was held in Amman, Jordan on July 27–28.

Results

References
1st day results
2nd day results

2007 Asian Athletics Championships
Combined events at the Asian Athletics Championships